Avag Mkhargrdzeli or Zakarian (died 1250 AD) was a Georgian noble of Armenian descent, he was atabeg and amirspasalar of Georgia during the 13th century.

The eastern areas Bjni, Gegharkunik, Vayots-dzor, Artsakh, Siunik, Nakhichevan, Dvin and Yerevan were under the jurisdiction of the atabeg Ivane Mkhargrdzeli and his son Avag. First Dvin and later Bjni were centres of this division. The subjects of Ivane’s family were the Orbelians, Khaghbakian, Dopians, Hasan-Jalalyan and others.

His sister, Tamta, through forced marriages to members of the Saladin and Khwarazmian dynasties, and capture by the Mongol empire, served as governor, regent, or ruler of Akhlat at points throughout the early 13th century.

Biography 
During Mongol invasion of Georgia Queen Rusudan had to evacuate Tbilisi for Kutaisi, leaving eastern Georgia in the hands of atabeg Avag Mkhargrdzeli and Kakhetian lord, Egarslan Bakurtsikheli, who made peace with the Mongols and agreed to pay them tribute. Avag Mkhargrdzeli, who was raised by Queen Rusudan from the rank of spasalar to amirspasalar (Lord High Constable), and then to that of atabeg (tutor) arranged the submission of Queen Rusudan to the Mongols in 1243, and Georgia officially acknowledged the Great Khan as its overlord. During this period of interregnum (1245–1250), with the two Davids absent at the court of the Great Khan in Karakorum, the Mongols divided the Kingdom of Georgia into eight districts (tumen), one of them commanded by Avag Mkhargrdzeli. Exploiting the complicated issue of succession on Georgian throne, the Mongols had the Georgian nobles divided into two rival parties, each of which advocated their own candidate to the crown, where Avag was supporting candidacy of David Narin.

David VII of Georgia visited the estates of atabag Avag when he died, leaving no son behind, but only a daughter by the name of Khuashak. The King came to the funeral in Bjni and noticed the good-looking widow of Avag, Gvantsa. He fell in love with her and a little time later took her as his wife and Queen, and brought her to his kingdom. And he left Avag's daughter to govern her estate, entrusting her to the supervision of Sadun of Mankaberdi.

Matosavank monastery was constructed with the oversight of Avag.

References

1250 deaths
House of Mkhargrdzeli
Nobility of Georgia (country)
Military personnel from Georgia (country)
13th-century people from Georgia (country)
Year of birth unknown
Politicians from Georgia (country)
Georgian people of Armenian descent